Orangeville Rise is the second largest spring in the U.S. state of Indiana, in Orange County near Orangeville. It was designated a National Natural Landmark in June 1972.  It is owned and managed by The Nature Conservancy and the Indiana Karst Conservancy.

Geology
The spring fluctuates wildly in response to drought and rain events, with storm discharge appearing less than 24 hours following an event.

See also
Lost River (Indiana)

References

External links
 The Nature Conservancy: Rise at Orangeville
 Rise at Orangeville, National Park Service
Indiana Department of Natural Resources

National Natural Landmarks in Indiana
Geography of Orange County, Indiana
Protected areas established in 1972
Nature Conservancy preserves